Down for Life may refer to:
Down for Life (film), a 2009 American dramatic film
Down for Life (band)  an Indonesian metal band
Down for Life (album) by D4L
"Down for Life" (song), a song by DJ Khaled

See also
D4L, an American band